Major-General Andrew Peter Farquhar , is a former British Army officer who commanded 5th Division.

Military career
Educated at Pocklington School, the University of Sheffield and the Royal Military Academy Sandhurst, Farquhar was commissioned into the Green Howards in 1973. He became commanding officer of 1st Bn the Green Howards in 1994. He was appointed Commander of 15th Infantry Brigade in 2000, Deputy Commanding General of the Multi-National Force – Iraq in 2004 and General Officer Commanding 5th Division in 2005 before retiring in 2008.

He was appointed a Member of the Order of the British Empire in 1980 and advanced to Commander of the Order of the British Empire in the 2003 Birthday Honours.

Civic and charitable role
In retirement he became a management consultant. He is also a Deputy Lieutenant of Staffordshire.

References

|-

1953 births
Living people
British Army major generals
Commanders of the Order of the British Empire
Deputy Lieutenants of Staffordshire
People educated at Pocklington School
Alumni of the University of Sheffield
Graduates of the Royal Military Academy Sandhurst